The canton of Rioz is an administrative division of the Haute-Saône department, northeastern France. Its borders were modified at the French canton reorganisation which came into effect in March 2015. Its seat is in Rioz.

It consists of the following communes:
 
Aulx-lès-Cromary
Authoison
La Barre
Beaumotte-Aubertans
Besnans
Bouhans-lès-Montbozon
Boulot
Boult
Bussières
Buthiers
Cenans
Chambornay-lès-Bellevaux
Chassey-lès-Montbozon
Chaux-la-Lotière
Cirey
Cognières
Cordonnet
Cromary
Dampierre-sur-Linotte
Échenoz-le-Sec
Filain
Fondremand
Fontenois-lès-Montbozon
Hyet
Larians-et-Munans
Loulans-Verchamp
Le Magnoray
Maizières
La Malachère
Maussans
Montarlot-lès-Rioz
Montbozon
Neuvelle-lès-Cromary
Ormenans
Pennesières
Perrouse
Quenoche
Recologne-lès-Rioz
Rioz
Roche-sur-Linotte-et-Sorans-les-Cordiers
Ruhans
Sorans-lès-Breurey
Thieffrans
Thiénans
Traitiéfontaine
Trésilley
Vandelans
Vellefaux
Villers-Bouton
Villers-Pater
Voray-sur-l'Ognon
Vy-lès-Filain

References

Cantons of Haute-Saône